Young Distance (also known as Woman in the Moon, The Moon Woman and The Night of the Full Moon) is a 1988 Italian romantic drama film written and directed by Vito Zagarrio. It was produced by Rete Italia with a budget of about a billion lire.

Plot
Angela, an Italian-American woman, after many years returned to Sicily to attend the funeral of her father. During the ferry trip she knows Salvo, a teenager who claims to be hunted by the Mafia, because of a quantity of drugs he stole to some criminals. Angela decides to give him a ride and the two embark on a journey through Sicily.

Cast 
Greta Scacchi as  Angela
 Luca Orlandini as  Salvo
Tim Finn as  Steve
 Mike Magistro as  Toti Mazza
 Marcello Perracchio as  Joe Lacagnina

References

External links

1988 romantic drama films
1988 films
Italian romantic drama films
Films directed by Vito Zagarrio
Films set in Sicily
1980s Italian films